Diamond Lake is the name of at least nine different lakes in Ontario, Canada:

 Diamond Lake, Kenora District 
 Diamond Lake, Cochrane District 
 Diamond Lake, Algoma District 
 Diamond Lake, Sudbury District 
 Diamond Lake, Hastings County 
 Diamond Lake, Nipissing District/Sudbury District 
 Diamond Lake, Timiskaming District 
 Diamond Lake, Renfrew County 
 Diamond Lake, Parry Sound District

See also
List of lakes in Ontario

References

Lakes of Ontario